Kanpur Civil Aerodrome  is an aerodrome located inside Kanpur Cantonment and is 5 kilometres east of Kanpur city. It is used by small aircraft of the flying club of Kanpur, the DGCA, the local flying school and the NCC Air Wing.

Incident and accidents
On the morning of 18 May 1996, a 19-seater Archana Airways L-410 aircraft operating on the Delhi - Kanpur sector touched down late and could not be stopped within the available runway length, ending up beyond the runway. The aircraft hit the boundary wall of the airport and came to a halt. The aircraft sustained major damages, but there was no fire and no injury to persons on board the aircraft.

References

See also
 List of airports by ICAO code: V#VA VE VI VO - India
 List of airports in India
 IIT Kanpur Airport

Defunct airports in India
Airports in Uttar Pradesh
Airports with year of establishment missing